Harold Jack Stamper (6 October 1889 – January 1939) was an English amateur footballer who competed in the 1912 Summer Olympics. He was part of the English team, which won the gold medal in the football tournament. He played one match.

References

External links
 

1889 births
1939 deaths
English footballers
English Olympic medallists
England amateur international footballers
Footballers at the 1912 Summer Olympics
Olympic footballers of Great Britain
Olympic gold medallists for Great Britain
Olympic medalists in football
Medalists at the 1912 Summer Olympics
Association football midfielders